National Highway 502A, commonly referred to as NH 502A is a national highway in  India. It is a spur road of National Highway 2. NH-502A traverses the state of Mizoram and in India.

Route 
Lawngtlai on NH-2 and terminating at Myanmar Border (Kaladan Road).

Junctions  
 
  Terminal near Lawngtlai.

See also 

 List of National Highways in India by highway number
 List of National Highways in India by state

References

External links 

 NH 502A on OpenStreetMap

National highways in India
National Highways in Mizoram